Andrés Alberto Flores Jaco (born January 20, 1995) is a Salvadoran professional footballer who plays as a defender for Primera División club FAS and the El Salvador national team.

Alianza F.C.

His contract was renewed for two more years in 2016 and is sufficient until 2018.

Starting for Alianza in a fixture against Atlético Marte, Flores was injured after a sliding tackle. He underwent tests in order to verify the severity of the injury which was inflicted on his left leg.

Honours

Club
FAS
Salvadoran Primera División: Clausura 2021

Personal life
Flores Jaco attends the Universidad Salvadoreña Alberto Masferrer.

References

External links
 
 

1995 births
Living people
Sportspeople from Santa Ana, El Salvador
Salvadoran footballers
El Salvador international footballers
Association football defenders
Alianza F.C. footballers
Santa Tecla F.C. footballers